An informal network of non-profit community organizations across Canada. The work of social planning organizations (also referred to as "Social Planning Councils") focuses on a range of community development and social justice issues.

Purpose

The general purpose of social planning organizations is to help build and strengthen community.

Social planning organizations may undertake a variety of activities, including:
Conducting social research
Policy analysis and development
Planning, convening and collaborating
Social enterprise and social innovation
Community mobilization, and 
Advocacy

Their work focuses around social issues affecting individuals and families, including:
Diversity
Immigrant/refugee and newcomer services
Affordable housing
Social determinants of health
poverty and social exclusion
"The working poor" and living wage
Social determinants of health in poverty
Social inequality
GIS mapping and social indicator work

Challenges

Social planning organizations face numerous challenges in their work:

High complexity of social issues
Government-Related Challenges
Implications of federal, provincial and municipal budget measures
Reshaping of the social policy agenda
Shifting role of the state in social policy (e.g. federal/provincial responsibilities, focus on the "fiscal imbalance," etc.)
Changing relationships with all levels of government 
Changing provincial government priorities (greater challenges to put poverty on the agenda)
Impact of service downloading from government to private, non-government and non-profit organizations.
Demographic Challenges
Growing immigrant and visible minority populations
Diverse types of communities (urban, rural, northern, remote, reserves)
Growing ethnic, cultural and linguistic diversity 
Economic and Infrastructure Challenges
Shifting regional economies (e.g. urbanization)
Changing social infrastructure needs
Increasing economic disparity (Income inequality metrics)

History

Informal networking between SPOs has taken place to varying degrees since 1976.
In the beginning, the Canadian Council on Social Development (CCSD) took a leadership role in bringing the local/regional councils together around social policy issues. Since the 1980s, individuals social planning organizations have taken a greater role in organizing SPO conferences and collaborating on social issues.

Due to the high number of social planning organizations in Ontario, communication and collaboration between SPOs in that province are more frequent than in other provinces across Canada. The Social Planning Network of Ontario (SPNO) has often facilitated discussions between Ontario-based organizations.

National SPO collaborations

Falling Fortunes (2006–2008)
A two-year national project (January 2006 through March 2008) aimed at identifying strategies to improve the income and wages, including the living wage, of young families and their children.

Partners:
Community Services Council, Newfoundland and Labrador
Family Service Association of Toronto
Social Planning Council of Winnipeg
First Call: BC Child and Youth Advocacy Coalition

Inclusive Cities Canada (2003)
A multi-year cross-Canada civic initiative with the purpose of enhancing social inclusion across Canada. The goals of Inclusive Cities Canada (ICC) are to strengthen the capacity of cities to create and sustain inclusive communities for the mutual benefit of all people, and to ensure that community voices of diversity are recognized as core Canadian ones.

Partners:
Social Planning & Research Council of British Columbia
Edmonton Social Planning Council
Community Development Halton
Community Social Planning Council of Toronto
 Human Development Council of Saint John
Federation of Canadian Municipalities

List of social planning organizations

Northwest Territories

Social Planning Coalition of the Northwest Territories

British Columbia
 Community Social Planning Council of Greater Victoria Victoria
 Social Planning & Research Council of British Columbia
United Way Research Services - United Way of the Lower Mainland
Mission Association for Social Planning
 Social Planning Council for the North Okanagan
Sunshine Coast Social Planning Council - this is not in BC, it is in Australia
Social Planning Council of Williams Lake and Area - Williams Lake, BC

Alberta
 Edmonton Social Planning Council

Saskatchewan

Regina Council on Social Development

Manitoba
 Winnipeg Social Planning Council

Ontario
 Social Planning Network of Ontario (SPNO)
 Amherstburg Community Services
 Lakeshore Community Services
 Community Social Planning Council Kingsville – Leamington
 Community Development Council Durham
 Community Development Council of Quinte
 Community Development Halton
 Social Planning Toronto
 Social Planning Council of York Region
 Essex Community Services
Elgin Area Social Research and Awareness Council
 Lakehead Social Planning Council
London Social Planning Council
 North Bay and Area Social Planning Council
 North Durham Social Development Council
 People & Organizations in North Toronto (POINT)
 Perth County Social Planning Council
 Peterborough Social Planning Council
 Social Planning Council of Cambridge & North Dumfries
 Social Planning Council of Kingston and District
 Social Planning Council of Kitchener-Waterloo
 Social Planning and Research Council of Hamilton
 Social Planning Council of Peel
Social Planning Council of Sudbury
 Social Planning Council of Ottawa-Carleton
 South Essex Community Council
 United Way and Community Services of Guelph and Wellington

New Brunswick
 Human Development Council

Newfoundland and Labrador
 Community Services Council

External links
 Canadian Council on Social Development
Canadian Council on Social Development – Canadian Political Parties and Political Interest Groups – Web Archive created by the University of Toronto Libraries
 CCSD list of Canadian Social Planning Councils
 Inclusive Cities Canada
 Falling Fortunes Canada

Sources
 http://www.ccsd.ca/pubs/2006/spn/spo_meeting_may2006.pdf
 http://www.inclusivecities.ca/index.html

Non-profit organizations based in Canada
Community development organizations